The  Miss California Teen USA competition is the pageant that selects the representative for the state of California in the Miss Teen USA pageant. It was formed in 1983. This pageant is part of the Miss USA Organization, owned by Miss USA 2008 Crystle Stewart.

California is in the top five most successful states at Miss Teen USA in terms  of number and value of placements. Miss California  een USA titleholders have been invited to red-carpet movie premieres, such as that for Santa Clause 3 attended by Kylee Lin, and She's the Man, attended by Jessica Powell.

The current titleholder is Cassidy Hill  of Newport Beach, who is crowned on June 5, 2022,  at the Hyatt Regency Orange County. Hill represented California for the title of  Miss Teen USA 2022 and was the second runner-up in the pageant.

History
In the 1980s, the pageant was directed by Richard Guy and Rex Holt, who also oversaw the Miss California USA, Miss Texas USA and Miss Texas Teen USA pageants. They lost the contract in 1990, when it came up for renewal.

Gallery of titleholders

Results summary

Placements
Miss Teen USAs: Shauna Gambill (1994), Cassidy Wolf (2013) 
1st runners-up: Jennifer Morgan (2002), Melanie Mitchell (2015) 
2nd runners-up: Michelle Cardamon (1996), Chelsea Gilligan (2009), Emma Baker (2010), Alexis Swanstrom (2011), Cassidy Hill (2022)
3rd runner-up: Bianca Vierra (2014)
4th runners-up: Stephanie Brink (2005), Jaanu Patel (2017) 
Top 6: Natasha Allas (1992)
Top 10: Shawn Gardner (1983), Angi Aylor (1987), Casey McClain (2001)
Top 12: Trisha Robey (1990), Kellie Foster-Moore (1995)
Top 15/16: Taylor Atkins (2008), Athenna Crosby (2016), Janeice Love (2018), Zoe Hunt (2020), Cameron Doan (2021)
California holds a record of 23 placements at Miss Teen USA.

Winners 

Color key

1 Age at the time of the Miss Teen USA pageant

References

External links
Official website

California
California culture
Women in California
1983 establishments in California